The Innocents is the third studio album by English synth-pop duo Erasure, released on 10 April 1988 by Sire and Reprise Records in the United States and on 18 April 1988 by Mute Records in Germany and the United Kingdom. Produced by Stephen Hague, it was the release that made Erasure superstars in their home country of the UK and gave them their breakthrough in the US.

The Innocents became the first in a string of number-one albums by Erasure in the UK, turning double platinum with sales over 600,000. Thanks to heavy exposure on MTV, it also spawned two major Billboard Hot 100 hits, a Top 50 placing on the Billboard 200 and Platinum album certification in the US. According to Nielsen SoundScan, 23 years after its release the album has sold a total of 5 million copies worldwide. It is their best selling album to date.

The album was remastered and re-released on 26 October 2009 to celebrate its 21st anniversary. Prefaced by an EP of remixes led by album track "Phantom Bride", the 21st Anniversary Edition came in a couple of flavours including a limited edition two CD/DVD set, packed inside a CD-sized 20-page hardback book that includes interviews with Vince Clarke and Andy Bell about the making of the record and their thoughts on all the tracks.

The second CD includes various rarities, including the 7″ version of the duo's take on "River Deep, Mountain High" and US-specific remixes of "Chains of Love" and "A Little Respect" that were not released in the UK singles box set.

The album cover image derives from the stained glass window of St. James and Charlemagne, in Chartres Cathedral.

Track listing
All tracks written by Andy Bell and Vince Clarke, except where noted.

 "A Little Respect" – 3:32
 "Ship of Fools" – 4:01
 "Phantom Bride" – 3:32
 "Chains of Love" – 3:38
 "Hallowed Ground" – 4:05
 "Sixty-Five Thousand" – 3:23
 "Heart of Stone" – 3:20
 "Yahoo!" – 3:48
 "Imagination" – 3:28
 "Witch in the Ditch" – 3:45
 "Weight of the World" – 3:40

CD / Cassette bonus tracks 

 "When I Needed You" (Melancholic Mix) – 4:22
 "River Deep, Mountain High" (Private Dance Mix) (Jeff Barry, Ellie Greenwich, Phil Spector) – 7:02

21st anniversary edition

CD one 

Same as above

CD two 

 "Ship of Fools" (Shiver Me Timbers Mix) – 7:53
 "When I Needed You" – 4:00
 "River Deep Mountain High" (7" Version) – 3:20
 "Chains of Love" (The Unfettered Mix) – 8:28
 "Don’t Suppose" (Country Joe Mix) – 5:58
 "The Good, the Bad and the Ugly" (The Dangerous Remix) (Ennio Morricone) – 4:42
 "A Little Respect" (12" House Mix) – 6:44
 "Like Zsa Zsa Zsa Gabor" (Mark Freegard Mix) – 4:56
 "Love Is Colder Than Death" – 2:13
 "Phantom Bride" (Live BBC 'In Concert') – 4:08
 "Heart of Stone" (Live BBC 'In Concert') – 3:37
 "Hallowed Ground" (Live BBC 'In Concert') – 3:55
 "Witch in the Ditch" (Live BBC 'In Concert') – 3:53

DVD 

The Innocents Live – NEC Birmingham 15/11/88
 "Chains of Love"
 "A Little Respect"
 "Witch in the Ditch" 
 "The Circus"
 "The Hardest Part"
 "Push Me Shove Me"
 "Gimme! Gimme! Gimme!" (Benny Andersson/Björn Ulvaeus)
 "Spiralling"
 "Hallowed Ground"
 "Oh L’Amour"
 "Who Needs Love Like That"
 "Stop!"
 "Victim of Love"
 "Ship of Fools"
 "Knocking on Your Door"
 "Sometimes"

The Innocents at the BBC
 "Ship of Fools" – Going Live!
 "A Little Respect" – Top of the Pops
 "The Innocents Live" (BBC 35-minute TV special – first broadcast 12 December 1988)

The Innocents – Promotional Videos
 "Ship of Fools"
 "Chains of Love"
 "A Little Respect"

The Innocents Live - Downloads
 MP3 files of The Innocents Live

2016 "Erasure 30" 30th anniversary BMG reissue LP
Subsequent to their acquisition of Erasure's back catalog and in anticipation of the band's 30th anniversary, BMG commissioned reissues of all previously released UK editions of Erasure albums up to and including 2007's Light at the End of the World. All titles were pressed and distributed by Play It Again Sam on 180-gram vinyl and shrinkwrapped with a custom anniversary sticker.

Charts

Weekly charts

Year-end charts

Certifications

References

1988 albums
Albums produced by Stephen Hague
Erasure albums
Mute Records albums
Sire Records albums